The 2015 Tour de France was the 102nd edition of the Tour de France, one of cycling's Grand Tours. The -long race consisted of 21 stages, starting on 4 July in Utrecht, the Netherlands, and concluding on 26 July with the Champs-Élysées stage in Paris. A total of 198 riders from 22 teams entered the race.

's Rohan Dennis won the first stage to take the general classification leader's yellow jersey.  rider Fabian Cancellara claimed it on the second, only to lose it after crashing out on the following stage. This put Froome in the lead, after the Tour's first uphill finish. He lost the position to 's Tony Martin at the end of the fourth stage, but Martin's withdrawal from the race after a crash at the end of the sixth stage put Froome back into the lead. He extended this lead during the stages in the Pyrenees and defended it successfully against attacks from Quintana during the final stages that took place in the Alps.

Froome became the first British rider to win the Tour twice, after his 2013 victory. Peter Sagan of  won the points classification. Froome also won the mountains classification. The best young rider was Quintana, with his team, Movistar, the winners of the team classification. André Greipel won the most stages, with four.

Teams

Twenty-two teams participated in the 2015 edition of the Tour de France. The race was the 18th of the 28 events in the UCI World Tour, and all of its seventeen UCI WorldTeams were automatically invited, and obliged, to attend the race. On 14 January 2015, the organiser of the Tour, Amaury Sport Organisation (ASO), announced the five second-tier UCI Professional Continental teams given wildcard invitations, one of which, was to become the first African-registered trade team to participate in the race's history. The team presentation – where the members of each team's roster are introduced in front of the media and local dignitaries – took place at Lepelenburg Park in Utrecht, the Netherlands, on 2 July, two days before the opening stage held in the city. Each team arrived in small boats along the Oudegracht canal.

Each squad was allowed a maximum of nine riders, therefore the start list contained a total of 198 riders. Of these, 45 were riding the Tour de France for the first time. The riders came from 32 countries; France, the Netherlands, Italy, Spain, Belgium, Australia, Germany, Great Britain and Switzerland all had 10 or more riders in the race. Riders from nine countries won stages during the race; German riders won the largest number of stages, with six. The average age of riders in the race was 29.67 years, ranging from the 21-year-old Kudus to 41-year-old Matteo Tosatto. Of the total average ages,  was the youngest team and  the oldest.

The teams entering the race were:

Pre-race favourites

In the lead up to the Tour, the main contenders for the general classification, known in the media as the 'big four', were Chris Froome, Alberto Contador, Nairo Quintana and Vincenzo Nibali. All had won at least one Grand Tour, amassing a total of twenty Grand Tour podiums. Former Tour de France winners Froome (2013) and Contador (2007 and 2009) returned to the race having crashed out of the 2014 edition. The other riders considered contenders were Tejay van Garderen, Thibaut Pinot, Joaquim Rodríguez, followed by 's Jean-Christophe Péraud and Romain Bardet.

Froome had shown his form during the season with overall victories at the Vuelta a Andalucía and the Critérium du Dauphiné, a race considered to be the warm-up for the Tour. Contador had earlier in the season won the Giro d'Italia and was aiming to become the first rider since Marco Pantani in 1998 to achieve the Giro-Tour double. He was also aiming to hold all three Grand Tour titles simultaneously, having won the 2014 Vuelta a España. Thirteen days before the start of the Tour, Contador won the Route du Sud, defeating Quintana by seventeen seconds. Quintana placed second in the 2013 Tour, winning the mountains and young rider classifications. He was absent in 2014 as he concentrated on the Giro d'Italia, which he won. His major victory of the 2015 season was the Tirreno–Adriatico. The defending champion Nibali was considered a contender, although his best result of the season was tenth in the Tour de Romandie, and placed thirteenth at the Dauphiné.

The sprinters considered favourites for the points classification and wins on the flat or hilly bunch sprint finishes were Alexander Kristoff, Mark Cavendish, André Greipel, Peter Sagan and John Degenkolb. Kristoff and Cavendish both showed their form during the season coming into the Tour, with eighteen and twelve wins, respectively. Greipel was also a contender, spearheaded by his sprint train, much like Cavendish. Three-time consecutive winner of the points classification Sagan was expected to have a hard time repeating as winner due to the changes in the classification's point structure and also due to the fact he had to ride in support of Contador. Degenkolb, who won the one-day classic races Milan–San Remo and Paris–Roubaix in the season, would take the lead of the  team due to the absence of the 2014 Tour's four-stage winner Marcel Kittel, who was not selected due to lack of fitness.

Route and stages

On 8 November 2013, the ASO announced Utrecht would host the 2015 edition's opening stages (known as the Grand Départ). It was the sixth time the Tour had started in the Netherlands, a record for a country outside France. The previous five were: 1954, in Amsterdam; 1973, in Scheveningen; 1978, in Leiden; 1996, in 's-Hertogenbosch; and 2010, in Rotterdam. Utrecht paid the ASO a reported €4m to host the Grand Départ. The full route of the Tour was unveiled on 22 October 2014 at the Palais des Congrès in Paris. At the event, the race director Christian Prudhomme described it as "atypique" (English: "atypical"), adding "If you do not climb, you will not win the Tour in 2015." The most noticeable differences were the lack of time trial kilometers and the mountainous terrain.

After the first stage in Utrecht, the second stage left the city to finish in the region of Zeeland in the south of the Netherlands. The third began in Antwerp, Belgium, and concluded at the Mur de Huy, a steep climb known for its inclusion in the one-day classic race La Flèche Wallonne. Stages five to nine crossed northern France westwards, beginning in the region of Nord-Pas-de-Calais and ending in Brittany. A long transfer took the race to the south of the country for next three stages through the Pyrenees, which include the Tour's most climbed mountain, the Col du Tourmalet, on stage eleven. Stages 13 to 16 formed a continuous four-stage journey that navigated eastwards to the Alps; four stages took place in and around the mountain range. A second long transfer took the Tour back to the north-east to finish with the Champs-Élysées stage in Paris.

Of the remaining stages, seven were officially classified as flat, five as medium mountain and seven as high mountain. Stages 3 and 8, although classified as flat, finished at the -high Mur de Huy and -high Mûr-de-Bretagne respectively. There were six summit finishes: stage 10, to La Pierre Saint-Martin; stage 11, to Cauterets; stage 12, to Plateau de Beille; stage 17, to Pra-Loup; stage 19, to La Toussuire to Les Sybelles; and stage 20, to Alpe d'Huez. On 25 June, it was announced that due to a landslide, the route of stage twenty would be changed, bypassing the Col du Galibier and instead climbing the Col de la Croix de Fer. The stage distance, however, remained intact. The highest point of elevation in the race was the -high Col d'Allos mountain pass on stage seventeen. There were seven hors catégorie (English: beyond category) rated climbs in the race. The Tour included six new start or finish locations. The rest days were after stage 9, in Pau, and after 16, in Gap.

Race overview

Grand Départ and journey west

His win put him in the race leader's yellow jersey. On stage two, crosswinds along the coastal route to the finish in Zeeland caused the peloton (the main group) to split into echelons, resulting in time gaps between riders. The stage ended in a bunch sprint, won by André Greipel, putting him in the green jersey as the leader of the points classification. Dennis was in a group that finished one minute twenty-eight seconds in arrears. Cancellara finished third placed in the stage and took the race lead, profiting from a time bonus missed by Martin, who came in ninth. The general classification favourites that gained time from being in the leading group of twenty-six were Chris Froome, Alberto Contador and Tejay van Garderen; the other favourites finished in the same group as Dennis. On the third stage, the race was neutralised following a major crash  from the finish which put six of riders out of the race, including Cancellara. The peloton continued to the final climb, the Mur de Huy, where Joaquim Rodríguez held off Froome to take the stage by one second. Rodríguez was awarded the first the polka dot jersey as the leader of the mountains classification and Froome took the yellow, while also gaining time over the other general classification favourites. It was the third day in succession Martin ended in second place overall, and to three different riders. The partially cobbled fourth stage saw Martin take the victory and the yellow jersey with an attack on the lead group  from the finish in Cambrai.

On the fifth stage, a bunch sprint occurred and Greipel got the better of it by beating Peter Sagan and Mark Cavendish, respectively. In the sixth stage, Zdeněk Štybar of  won after escaping on the concluding small ascent in the port city of Le Havre. A crash in the final kilometer forced Martin to abandon the Tour with a broken collarbone, the second yellow jersey wearer to surrender after Cancellara. A record was set after the stage, with Daniel Teklehaimanot becoming the first black African to lead the mountains classification. Although Froome now led the race, no rider wore the yellow jersey on stage seven as Martin had finished the stage and earned the right to wear it. Cavendish won the seventh from a bunch sprint in Fougères, Brittany. Froome was awarded the yellow jersey after the stage. Stage eight, finishing atop the Mûr-de-Bretagne, saw the first French victory of the Tour, with  rider Alexis Vuillermoz launching an attack inside the final kilometer to take the victory. The general classification favourites finished together except Vincenzo Nibali who lost ten seconds. The squad of Nairo Quintana, came in third, four seconds in arrears. Alberto Contador's  in fourth, twenty-eight seconds down, and Nibali's  following, a further seven seconds behind. The first rest day took place the following day in Pau.

Pyrenees and Massif Central

Stage ten was the race's first arrival at altitude with the finish at La Pierre Saint-Martin in the Pyrenees. The day's breakaway was caught and passed on the final climb by a select group. Froome attacked with  remaining to take the win, with teammate Richie Porte and Quintana a minute in arrears. The stage saw time gaps open up across the general classification leaders. The biggest loser was Nibali, who came in twenty-first, over four minutes behind Froome, who increased his lead to second placed Tejay van Garderen to two minutes and fifty-two seconds. Froome took the polka dot jersey and Greipel the green. Stage eleven was another mountainous stage; it was won by Rafał Majka, who was part of the early breakaway and attacked on the slopes of the Col du Tourmalet. He soloed across the line in Cauterets one minute ahead of second-placed Dan Martin. The green jersey returned to Sagan. Rodríguez gained his second victory of the race on stage twelve; he was part of an early twenty-two rider breakaway that reached the final climb to Plateau de Beille. Froome kept his lead intact.

Stage thirteen saw the escapees being brought inside the one kilometer to go marker (known as the flamme rouge). Greg Van Avermaet of  took the uphill victory ahead of the chasing Sagan. On stage fourteen, a twenty-four rider breakaway reached the final climb, the Côte de la Croix Neuve. After the breakaway had fractured, Thibaut Pinot and Romain Bardet led over the summit, before Steve Cummings of  overtook them to take the victory at Brenoux Airport on the plateau above Mende. Sagan was part of the breakaway, amassing maximum points at the intermediate sprint. Over four minutes after Cummings had finished, Froome outsprinted Quintana while the other general classification favourites were slightly distanced. Quintana moved into second place overall, displacing Van Garderen. Stage fifteen had for principal difficulty the Col de l'Escrinet climb, which saw most of the sprinters succeeding at passing the climb in the lead group, with the notable exception of Cavendish. Greipel won his third stage of the Tour, followed by John Degenkolb and Alexander Kristoff, respectively. On the next stage, featuring the Col de Manse as the final climb, Rubén Plaza escaped the leading group of breakaway riders on the ascent. Sagan chased him down the descent, but to no avail as Plaza soloed to victory in Gap. The next day was the second rest day, spent in Gap.

Alps and finale

Stage seventeen, the first of four Alpine stages, saw third placed overall Van Garderen withdraw from the race with illness. The stage was won by 's Simon Geschke, who escaped from the breakaway with under  remaining to win in Pra-Loup. Fifth placed overall Contador crashed on the descent of the Col d'Allos, losing over two minutes to race leader Froome. On stage eighteen, Bardet attacked the breakaway close to the summit of the Col du Glandon and opened a gap on descent before riding solo to victory in Saint-Jean-de-Maurienne. Bardet moved up to tenth overall and became joint first with Rodríguez in the mountains classification, displacing Froome. In the Tour's queen stage, nineteenth, Nibali broke away from the general classification group close to the summit of the Col de la Croix de Fer to bridge and pass the breakaway group and win at La Toussuire - Les Sybelles. Quintana came in second, forty-four seconds later, with Froome coming in a further thirty. In the Tour's penultimate stage, a select group of riders attacked on the Col de la Croix de Fer and made it to the finish on Alpe d'Huez, where they met the disintegrate early breakaway. Pinot attacked passed the breakaways to take the victory ahead of the encroaching Quintana, who came in second after attacking the chasing general classification group on the Alpe. Quintana gained a margin of eighty seconds over Froome, but it was not enough and had to settle for second place overall.

The final stage in Paris was won by Greipel, his fourth victory of this year's Tour. Froome finished the race to claim his second Tour de France, becoming the first British rider to win the race on two occasions. He beat second-placed Quintana by seventy-two seconds, with his  teammate Alejandro Valverde third. Froome also claimed the mountains classification, the first time a rider had won both since Eddy Merckx in 1970. Although he failed to win any stages during the race, Sagan won his fourth consecutive points classification with a total of 432, 66 ahead of Greipel in second. The best young rider was Quintana, followed by Bardet and 's Warren Barguil, respectively.  finished as the winners of the team classification, over fifty-seven minutes ahead of second-placed . Of the 198 starters, 160 reached the finish of the last stage in Paris.

Classification leadership and minor prizes

There were four main individual classifications contested in the 2015 Tour de France, as well as a team competition. The most important was the general classification, which was calculated by adding each rider's finishing times on each stage. Time bonuses (time subtracted) returned to the Tour for the first time since the 2008 edition. For all stage finishes, excluding the two time trial stages, the three first finishers of stages earned bonuses of 10, 6 and 4 seconds respectively. Of the reintroduction, race director Christian Prudhomme said: "We want to open up the race, we want the race to be decided on any day of the Tour." If a crash had happened within the final  of a stage, not including time trials and summit finishes, the riders involved would have received the same time as the group they were in when the crash occurred. The rider with the lowest cumulative time was the winner of the general classification and was considered the overall winner of the Tour. The rider leading the classification wore a yellow jersey. Rain on the final stage forced the final times of the general classification to be taken on the first crossing of the finish line before the ten laps of the cobbled Champs-Élysées. Riders were required to cross the finish line on the final lap to receive their times.

The second classification was the points classification. Riders received points for finishing among the highest placed in a stage finish, or in intermediate sprints during the stage. The points system was also changed. A stage win was worth 50 points instead of 45, second place awarded 30 instead of 35 and third 20 instead of 30. The sprint points rule change aimed to make a stage win more valuable. The points available for each stage finish were determined by the stage's type. The new system was in effect only on the Tour's six stages classified as flat (stages 2, 5, 6, 7, 15 and 21). On seven stages (the cobble stage and six hillier stages, namely stages 3, 4, 8, 10, 13, 14 and 16) the rider who won received 30 points, 25 for the second rider, and so on. For the mountain stages (stages 11, 12, 17, 18, 19, 20) and the individual time trial (stage 1), the winner received 20 points. No points were awarded for the team time trial on stage nine. The leader was identified by a green jersey.

The third classification was the mountains classification. Points were awarded to the riders that reached the summit of the most difficult climbs first. The climbs were categorised as fourth-, third-, second-, first-category and hors catégorie, with the more difficult climbs rated lower. Double points were awarded on the summit finishes on stages 10, 12, 17, 19 and 20. The leader wore a white jersey with red polka dots.

The final individual classification was the young rider classification. This was calculated the same way as the general classification, but the classification was restricted to riders who were born on or after 1 January 1990. The leader wore a white jersey.

The final classification was a team classification. This was calculated using the finishing times of the best three riders per team on each stage, excluding the team time trial; the leading team was the team with the lowest cumulative time. The number of stage victories and placings per team determined the outcome of a tie. The riders in the team that lead this classification were identified with yellow number bibs on the back of their jerseys and yellow helmets.

In addition, there was a combativity award given after each stage to the rider considered, by a jury, to have "made the greatest effort and who has demonstrated the best qualities of sportsmanship". No combativity awards were given for the time trials and the final stage. The winner wore a red number bib the following stage. At the conclusion of the Tour, Romain Bardet won the overall super-combativity award, again, decided by a jury.

A total of €2,030,150 was awarded in cash prizes in the race. The overall winner of the general classification received €450,000, with the second and third placed riders got €200,000 and €100,000 respectively. All finishers of the race were awarded with money. The holders of the classifications benefited on each stage they led;  the final winners of the points and mountains were given €25,000, while the best young rider and most combative rider got €20,000. Team prizes were available, with €10,000 for the winner of team time trial and €50,000 for the winners of the team classification. €8,000 was given to the winners of each stage of the race. There were also two special awards each with a prize of €5000, the Souvenir Jacques Goddet, given to the first rider to pass Goddet's memorial at the summit of the Col du Tourmalet in stage eleven, and the Souvenir Henri Desgrange, given in honour of Tour founder Henri Desgrange to the first rider to pass the summit of the Col du Galibier in stage twenty. Due to a route change the Souvenir Henri Desgrange was replaced with the Col d'Allos in stage seventeen. Rafał Majka won the Jacques Goddet and Simon Geschke won the Henri Desgrange.

 In stage two, Tony Martin, who was second in the points classification, wore the green jersey, because first placed Rohan Dennis wore the yellow jersey as leader of the general classification. Additionally, Tom Dumoulin, who was second in the young rider classification, wore the white jersey for the same reason.
 In stage seven, no rider wore the yellow jersey after Tony Martin, who was first in the general classification, withdrew from the race due to injury.
 In stage nine, Warren Barguil, who was second in the young rider classification, wore the white jersey, because Peter Sagan wore the green jersey as leader of the points classification.
 In stage ten, Nairo Quintana, who was second in the young rider classification, wore the white jersey, because Peter Sagan wore the green jersey as leader of the points classification. Additionally, Bartosz Huzarski, awarded in stage eight, wore the red number bib as no combativity award was awarded after stage nine.
 In stages eleven and twelve, Richie Porte, who was second in the mountains classification, wore the polka dot jersey, because Chris Froome wore the yellow jersey as leader of the general classification.
 In stages thirteen to eighteen, Joaquim Rodríguez, who was second in the mountains classification, wore the polka dot jersey, because Chris Froome wore the yellow jersey as leader of the general classification.
 In stage twenty one, Romain Bardet, who was third in the mountains classification, wore the polka dot jersey, because Chris Froome wore the yellow jersey as leader of the general classification and Nairo Quintana, who was second wore the white jersey as leader of the young rider classification.

Final standings

General classification

Points classification

Mountains classification

Young rider classification

Team classification

UCI World Tour rankings

Riders from the WorldTeams competing individually, as well as for their teams and nations, for points that contributed towards the World Tour rankings. Points were awarded to the top twenty finishers in the general classification and to the top five finishers in each stage. The 238 points accrued by Chris Froome moved him up to second in the individual ranking, behind Alejandro Valverde. Despite 's strong showing,  took over the lead of the team ranking due to Froome's points. With three riders in the top ten, Spain remained the leaders of the nation ranking.

See also

 2015 in men's road cycling
 2015 in sports
 2015 La Course by Le Tour de France

Notes

References

Bibliography

Further reading

External links

 

 
2015
2015 UCI World Tour
2015 in French sport
2015 in Dutch sport
July 2015 sports events in France
2015 Tour de France
2015 Tour de France